The Sony DCR-VX1000 was a DV tape camcorder released by Sony in 1995, replaced by the DCR-VX2000 in 2000 and the DCR-VX2100 in mid 2003.

Overview
The camera's MSRP was USD $3000 when it came out. With three 1/3-inch CCDs, a digital sensor resolution of 410,000 pixels, and an analog horizontal resolution of better than 530 lines, its resolution and video clarity were nearly unsurpassed, even by models far past its price point. It was the first consumer camcorder with the ability to transfer video information via Firewire to an ordinary Windows or Macintosh computer, and also the first to use both the MiniDV tape format and three-CCD color processing technology—boasting twice the horizontal resolution of VHS and triple the color bandwidth of single-CCD cameras.

Together with the rival Canon XL1 and shorter-lived "budget" three-CCD DV models like the Canon GL1 and Sony DCR-TRV900, the VX1000 revolutionized desktop video production in the late 1990s, delivering quality comparable to then-dominant analog Betacam hardware at a fraction of the cost. Even years after being discontinued, the VX1000 enjoyed a devoted secondhand following from skateboarding and BMX action sports filmmakers, thanks to its relative portability, sturdy construction, and fisheye lens attachments. Today the VX1000 is used among cult skateboarding filmmakers and has become one of the strongest symbols of street skateboarding culture since it has featured in iconic videos over two decades.

The VX1000 was based on Sony's earlier VX1 (PAL) and VX3 (NTSC) Hi8 camcorders, which were similarly intended as "prosumer" models, targeted at both high-end consumer and low-end professional users. In the mid-1990s, Sony began to move away from Hi8 tape in favor of the emerging DV format, and as a result the VX3 and VX1 were discontinued in 1995. However, their iconic form factor, with a distinctively-shaped stereo microphone array at the front of the handle, was reused by the VX1000 and numerous later Sony DV and HDV camcorders in the VX, PD, FX and Z lines.

At the time, Sony had a pattern of releasing "professional" upgraded versions of their most popular consumer cameras, with the same chassis shape but made from more durable materials and in a darker color. Extra features included XLR inputs and the ability to record in the higher-grade DVCAM format. The VX1000 however had no professional equivalent apart from the shoulder-mounted VX9000 and DVCAM equivalent DSR200(with "A" and "P" variants) - it used the same 3ccd sensor chips and lens, however used fullsize DV tapes compared to miniDV. (its successor, the VX2000 was offered as DSR-PD150, notably used in the production of David Lynch's 2006 feature film Inland Empire, and the VX2100 as DSR-PD170 and later on in slight modification as DSR-PD175).

A VX1000 was used to film the British hidden camera show Trigger Happy TV.

References

DCR-VX1000
DCR-VX1000